Rustam II, was the twelfth ruler of the Bavand dynasty from 964 to 979. He was the brother and successor of Shahriyar II.

Rustam was the son of Sharwin II. In 964, Shahriyar was deposed because of his pro-Ziyarid policies in favor of his pro-Buyid brother Rustam. Rustam was the first Bavand ruler who embraced Shia Islam. Shahriyar later tried to reclaim the Bavand throne by invading Tabaristan with a Samanid army in 968, but to no avail. Rustam died in 979, and was succeeded by his son Al-Marzuban.

Sources 
 
 

Bavand dynasty
10th-century monarchs in Asia
10th-century Iranian people